The Yuba-Sutter Transit Authority, operating as Yuba-Sutter Transit, is the public transportation agency serving the Yuba–Sutter area in Northern California.

Service
Yuba-Sutter Transit runs six local bus routes in Marysville, Yuba City and surrounding communities, running hourly or half-hourly between 6:30 am and 6:30 pm Mondays through Saturdays. There is also weekday commuter and midday service to Sacramento along Routes 70 and 99; three rural routes to Live Oak, the Yuba County foothills, and Wheatland; and Dial-a-Ride service available to seniors and those with disabilities as both a paratransit and door-to-door service, with general public availability offered after 6:00 pm.

Fares
The basic one-way fare is $1.50 on local fixed routes, $3 on rural routes, and $4.50 on commuter and midday express services. Dial-a-Ride service has a base fare of $3 during the day and $2 after 6:00 pm for senior (65+), Disabled or ADA certified. Up to two children 4 or under may travel free with a paying adult on any route. In addition, on all routes except the commute-hour Sacramento service, a 50% fare discount is provided to seniors 65 or older, youths from 5-18, and disabled riders with approved ID. 

Ticket sheets are available in denominations of fifty cents (for $10 per sheet) or seventy-five cents (for $15 per sheet), and they are good on local and rural routes, Dial-a-Ride, and routes serving Sacramento. Monthly passes valid on local fixed routes are available for $30 to the general public and $15 to youths, seniors, and the disabled. Any discount-status passes are also valid on rural routes. For commuter services a monthly commuter pass costs $135, and a combined Yuba-Sutter Transit/Sacramento RT monthly pass for $185.

Route list

Local fixed routes

Rural
All rural routes terminate at the Yuba County Government Center.

Commuter
Yuba-Sutter Transit provides nine scheduled peak-hour commuter bus runs each in the morning and afternoon, three along Routes 70 and six along Route 99. Morning commuter buses first depart for Sacramento at 5:20 am, with the last morning bus arriving in Sacramento at 7:45 am. The first bus in the afternoon leaves downtown Sacramento at 3:45 pm, while the last bus arrives at the Yuba County Government Center at 6:35 pm. Three midday express buses to and from Sacramento run during off-peak hours, arriving in Sacramento around 9:00 am, noon, and 2:00 pm.

History

Current fleet
There are 51 buses in the Yuba-Sutter Transit fleet currently in revenue service. Each bus uses diesel fuel and has room for two wheelchair passengers.

References

External links
Official Yuba-Sutter Transit website

Bus transportation in California
Transportation in Sutter County, California
Transportation in Sacramento, California
Transportation in Yuba County, California
Marysville, California
Yuba City, California